The 2018–19 Mercer Bears women's basketball team represents Mercer University during the 2018–19 NCAA Division I women's basketball season. The Bears, led by ninth-year head coach Susie Gardner, play their home games at the Hawkins Arena as members of the Southern Conference (SoCon). They finished the season 25–3, 16–0 in Southern Conference play win the Southern Conference regular season. They won the SoCon women's tournament to earn an automatic trip to the NCAA women's tournament where they lost to Iowa in the first round.

Roster

Schedule

 
|-
!colspan=9 style=| Non-conference regular season

|-
!colspan=9 style=| SoCon Regular Season

|-
!colspan=9 style=| SoCon Tournament

|-
!colspan=9 style=| NCAA Women's Tournament

Rankings
2018–19 NCAA Division I women's basketball rankings

References

Mercer Bears women's basketball seasons
Mercer
Mercer Bears
Mercer Bears
Mercer